Festival international du cinéma francophone en Acadie (trans: International Francophone Film Festival in Acadie), or FICFA, is a francophone international film festival held annually in Moncton, New Brunswick.

Since its creation in 1987, FICFA has grown to become the largest film festival in New Brunswick and one of the largest international francophone film festivals in North America. With an official program that includes over 100 films each year, FICFA is an important gathering of over 20,000 movie lovers and more than 150 delegates from Canada, Europe and Africa.

FICFA was created in 1987 following the Quebec City Francophonie Summit. The City of Moncton was selected to host such a festival as a tribute to those who worked for centuries in order to preserve their language and culture. The Moncton community wished to make FICFA an annual event and in 1992, Film Zone was incorporated. Film Zone is in charge of organizing FICFA, its principal event.

FICFA's mission is to promote francophone cinema in Acadie and Acadian cinema in Acadie itself and the Francophonie.  Since its first edition, it has presented thousands of films from around the world.

Its objectives include developing interest for francophone cinema in Acadie, developing interest for francophone cinema in school settings, contributing to the development and promotion of the Acadian cinema industry, and encouraging partnerships with other francophone festivals.

Prix La Vague

The FICFA jury, composed of professionals from Canadian and international cinema industries, attributes the Prix La Vague Awards every year in different categories:

2007

2008 

Honorable mentions were also awarded to Isabelle Blais for her performance in Lyne Charlebois's film Borderline, and to Claude Fournier for his musical contributions to Rodolphe Caron's Marie-Hélène Allain en dialogue avec la pierre.

2009

2010

2011

2012

2013

2014

2015

2016

2017

2018

2019

2020 

An honorable mention was given to Kelly Depeault for her performance in Goddess of the Fireflies (La déesse des mouches à feu). Due to the online format, no People's Choice award was presented.

2021

2022

References

External links
FICFA Official Website(in French)

Acadian film
Film festivals in New Brunswick
Festivals in Moncton